Pultenaea tenella, commonly known as delicate bush-pea, is a species of flowering plant in the family Fabaceae and is endemic to the high country near the border between New South Wales and Victoria in south-eastern continental Australia. It is a small, prostrate, mat-forming shrub with elliptic to linear leaves and yellow to orange and red, pea-like flowers.

Description
The upper surface of the leaves is glabrous but the lower surface is hairy.

Taxonomy and naming
Pultenaea tenella was first formally described in 1864 by George Bentham in Flora Australiensis from specimens collected by Ferdinand von Mueller at "an elevation of ". The specific epithet (tenella) means "delicate".

Distribution and habitat
This pultenaea grows in swamps and moist herbfields in the ranges of north-eastern Victoria, and there is a single record from Mount Kosciuszko in New South Wales.

References

tenella
Flora of New South Wales
Plants described in 1864
Taxa named by George Bentham